Agnese Āboltiņa (born 7 February 1996) is a Latvian alpine skier. She was born in Riga. She competed at the FIS Alpine World Ski Championships 2013 in Schladming, and at the 2014 Winter Olympics in Sochi, in  giant slalom, slalom and super-G. She placed 31st in super-G and 37th in slalom at the 2014 Olympics.

References

External links

 
 
 
 

1996 births
Living people
Latvian female alpine skiers
Olympic alpine skiers of Latvia
Alpine skiers at the 2014 Winter Olympics
Alpine skiers at the 2012 Winter Youth Olympics
Sportspeople from Riga
21st-century Latvian women